The Measuring Instruments Directive 2014/32/EU (the information is not updated and below this article refers to the old one 2004/22/EC), is a directive by the European Union, which seeks to harmonise many aspects of legal metrology across all member states of the EU. Its most prominent tenet is that all kinds of meters which receive a MID approval may be used in all countries across the EU.

The MID covers these measuring instruments:
 Water meters
 Gas meters and volume conversion devices
 Active electrical energy meters
 Heat meters
 Measuring systems for the continuous and dynamic measurement of quantities of liquids other than water
 Automatic weighing instruments
 Taximeters
 Material measures
 Dimensioning systems
 Exhaust gas analysers

Measuring instruments that comply with the MID bear:
 the CE mark
 a capital letter "M" and the last two digits of the year of its affixing, surrounded by a rectangle
 the identification number of the notified body involved in conformity assessment

The Measuring Instruments Directive was published on 30 April 2004 in the Official Journal of the EU, but not applied until after 30 October 2006 and there will be a 10-year transition period. National implementations of the new legislation are currently in the works.

Two amendments of the Directive were published:

COMMISSION DIRECTIVE 2009/137/EC of 10 November 2009 Amending Directive 2004/22/EC of the European Parliament and of the Council on measuring instruments in respect of exploitation of the maximum permissible errors, as regards the instrument-specific annexes MI-001 to MI-005 and

Directive 2014/32/EU of the European Parliament and of the council of 26 February 2014 on the harmonisation of the laws of the Member States relating to the making available on the  market of measuring instruments

See also
WELMEC

References

2.

External links
EU legislation summary
Text of the directive (pdf)
Text of directive with headers (html)

European Union directives
2004 in law
2004 in the European Union
Metrication